Haft-e-Tir Square is a central cross section in Tehran's central business district. The square was renamed Haft-e-Tir in the years following the Iranian Revolution in 1979. The square was formally renamed after a bombing on 28 June 1981 (the 7th of Tir 1360 (Hafte Tir - هفت تیر) in the Iranian calendar), a powerful bomb went off at the headquarters of the Iran Islamic Republic Party (IRP) in Tehran, while a meeting of party leaders was in progress. Seventy-three leading officials of the Islamic Republic were killed, including Chief Justice Ayatollah Mohammad Beheshti, (who was the second most powerful figure in the revolution after Ayatollah Khomeini at the time). The People's Mujahedin of Iran or Mujahideen al-Khalq is thought to have been responsible for the attack.

Previously Haft-e-Tir was known as 25th Shahrivar Square, which was a name given by the former pre-revolutionary Pahlavi government up until the revolution.

Flashpoint
Haft-e-Tir is known across Tehran as one of the largest squares for congregating in. In 2009 during the post election protests against newly re-elected President Mahmoud Ahmadinejad the area was known as an area of protest.
In 2012 Haft-e-Tir again became the scene of large gatherings when thousands of people cheered on president-elect Hassan Rouhani who had just won the country's election with a landslide. Rouhani also had his main election campaign headquarters of the Karim Khan Street of the square.

Transport 
The square is connected to Karimkhan Zand Avenune to its west, to its north-north west it is connected to the Modarres Highway, running north to south of the square Mofatteh Street and to its north west it is connected by Ghaem Magham St.

Metro Link 
Haft-e-Tir Square is also connected to Line 1 of the Tehran Metro service, with a station by the same name situated on both east and west sides of the square.

Shopping 
Situated around the square are multiple shops selling all sorts of items. Haft-e-Tir Square is famous for reasonably priced women's clothing stores selling manteau's and other accessories. In recent years the area around the square had become famous for cultural activities including art galleries and cafes.

On the north side of the square, a new superstore called Yas opened in 2009, on the ground floor it sells food and toiletries and on the upper floors it has a clothes, white appliances and children's play area and food court.

Squares in Tehran